The 2017 North Carolina FC season was the club's 11th season of existence, and their first season rebranded as North Carolina FC. The club was previously known as the Carolina RailHawks. North Carolina FC finished the 2017 NASL Season in 3rd place in the combined standings earning a spot in the 2017 Soccer Bowl, where they lost 1–0 to the San Francisco Deltas. After the conclusion of the season on November 16, 2017, North Carolina FC announced it would be leaving the NASL effective immediately, and would be joining the USL for the 2018 season.

Roster

Transfers

Winter
Note: Flags indicate national team as has been defined under FIFA eligibility rules. Players may hold more than one non-FIFA nationality.

In:

Out:

Summer

In:

Out:

Friendlies

Competitions

NASL Spring season

Standings

Results summary

Results by round

Matches

NASL Fall season

Standings

Results summary

Results by round

Matches

The Championship

Bracket

Results

U.S. Open Cup

Squad statistics

Appearances and goals

|-
|colspan="14"|Players away on loan:
|-
|colspan="14"|Players who left North Carolina during the season:

|}

Goal scorers

Disciplinary record

References

External links

2017
North Carolina Football Club
North Carolina Football Club
2017 in sports in North Carolina